USS Gilbert Islands (CVE-107) (ex-St. Andrews Bay) was a  of the United States Navy.

She was launched on 20 July 1944 by the Todd-Pacific Shipyards in Tacoma, Washington. She was sponsored by Mrs. Edwin D. McMorries, wife of Captain Edwin D. McMorries, Surgeon at the Naval Hospital at Puget Sound Naval Yard, and commissioned on 5 February 1945 with Captain L. K. Rice in command.

She was reclassified as AGMR-1 on 1 June 1963, renamed  on 22 June 1963 and finally recommissioned on 7 March 1964.

Service history
After shakedown training, Gilbert Islands departed San Diego on 12 April 1945 for exercises in Hawaiian waters. She sailed on 2 May with an escort carrier force that closed Okinawa on 21 May. Her aircraft blasted and strafed concrete dugouts, troop concentrations, ammunition and fuel dumps on Okinawa from 24 to 31 May. In the following days she helped neutralize outlying Japanese airfields and installations with repeated bomb and rocket attacks. Four of her Marine pilots and three TBM Avenger gunners were killed in action in all of 1945. She departed Okinawa on 16 June to replenish at San Pedro Bay, thence to Balikpapan, Borneo. She gave air cover to Australians storming that shore 1 July and remained 4 days to attack all targets in sight. With the Australians securely established, she returned to Leyte on 6 July.

Gilbert Islands departed San Pedro Bay on 29 July to screen logistic ships replenishing 3rd Fleet striking forces along the coast of Japan. On that station 15 August she joined a task group that included nearly all the 3rd Fleet and heard Admiral Halsey's laconic direction: "Apparently the war is over and you are ordered to cease firing; so, if you see any Jap planes in the air, you will just have to shoot them down in a friendly manner." After replenishment at Okinawa, she departed on 14 October to participate in a show of air strength during occupation of Formosa by the Chinese 70th Army. She was then routed onward via Saipan and Pearl Harbor to San Diego, arriving on 4 December 1945. She remained in port until 21 January 1946, then set course for Norfolk where she decommissioned on 21 May 1946 and was placed in reserve.

Post-War
Towed to Philadelphia in November 1949, Gilbert Islands recommissioned on 7 September 1951 and put in at Boston on 25 November for overhaul. She joined the Atlantic Fleet on 1 August 1952, sailed 8 days later with a cargo of jets for Yokohama, Japan, arriving 18 September, and returned to her homeport of Quonset Point, Rhode Island on 22 October. She sailed on 5 January 1953 for the Caribbean to conduct training exercises off Cuba and returned to New England waters to continue these duties through the summer and fall of the year. Following a cruise to Halifax, Nova Scotia and overhaul at Boston, the escort carrier stood out on 5 January 1954 for a Mediterranean cruise, returning to Quonset Point on 12 March 1954 for reserve training and other exercises. She became the first of her class to have jets make touch-and-go landings on the flight deck while she had no way on, a dangerous experiment successfully conducted on 9 June 1954. She left Rhode Island on 25 June for Boston and decommissioned there on 15 January 1955.

As Annapolis

Reclassified AKV-39 on 7 May 1959, Gilbert Islands remained in reserve until her name was struck from the Naval Vessel Register in June 1961. She was reclassified AGMR-1 on 1 June 1963 and renamed  on 22 June 1963. Annapolis recommissioned on 7 March 1964, Captain John J. Rowan in command. As the Navy's first major communication relay ship, Annapolis was busy with acceptance trials for the rest of the year. In the fall, she handled communications during Operations Teamwork and Steel Pike before final acceptance into the fleet on 16 December.

Vietnam
After operations out of Norfolk for the first half of 1965, Annapolis was assigned Long Beach, California as home port on 28 June 1965. In September, she was sent to Vietnam to assist communications between naval units. In 1966, the first ship-to-shore satellite radio message ever transmitted and received was between Annapolis in the South China Sea to Pacific Fleet Headquarters at Pearl Harbor. With the exception of periodic visits to Hong Kong, Taiwan, and the Philippines for upkeep and training, she continued this important service into 1967, assuring a smooth and steady flow of information and orders. Annapolis was decommissioned 20 December 1969 at Norfolk, Virginia and was placed in the Pacific Reserve Fleet before being towed to Philadelphia Naval Shipyard where she was placed in mothballs. The ship was stricken from the Naval Vessel Register 15 October 1976 and sold for scrap 1 November 1979.

Annapolis earned seven campaign stars for Vietnam War service.

Awards

USS Gilbert Islands (CVE-107) 

 American Campaign Medal 
 Asiatic–Pacific Campaign Medal with 3 battle stars
 World War II Victory Medal
 Navy Occupation Service Medal with "Asia" and "Europe" clasps
 National Defense Service Medal
 Korean Service Medal
 United Nations Korea Medal

USS Annapolis (AGMR-1) 

 Navy Meritorious Unit Commendation 
 National Defense Service Medal with star (second award)
 Vietnam Service Medal with 8 campaign stars
 Republic of Vietnam Meritorious Unit Citation (Gallantry Cross Medal with Palm)
 Republic of Vietnam Campaign Medal

Gallery

References

External links
http://www.uss-annapolis.org
http://www.navsource.org/archives/03/107.htm
http://www.ibiblio.org/hyperwar/USN/ships/CVE/CVE-107_GilbertIslands.html
http://www.adamsplanes.com/index.htm
http://www.boston.quik.com/kurtdold/tonkin6.html

http://www.news.navy.mil/search/display.asp?story_id=2638

 

Commencement Bay-class escort carriers
World War II escort aircraft carriers of the United States
Cold War aircraft carriers of the United States
Ships built in Tacoma, Washington
1944 ships